Zarautz Kirol Elkartea is a Spanish football team based in Zarautz, in the autonomous community of Basque Country. Founded in 1944 it plays in División de Honor, holding home games at Estadio Asti, which has a capacity of 1,000 spectators.

Season to season

5 seasons in Tercera División

Famous players
 Estanislao Argote
  Juan Cuyami

References

External links
Futbolme team profile 
Zarautz Femenino at Txapeldunak

Football clubs in the Basque Country (autonomous community)
Association football clubs established in 1944
Divisiones Regionales de Fútbol clubs
1944 establishments in Spain
Sport in Gipuzkoa